This is a list of greenstone belts

Africa

Burkina Faso
Hounde greenstone belt
Boromo greenstone belt

Democratic Republic of the Congo
Kilo-Moto

Angola
Lufico - Cabinda
Cassinga

South Africa
Barberton greenstone belt
Pietersberg greenstone belt

Tanzania
Kilimafedha greenstone belt
Lake Victoria Greenstone Belt
Nzega Greenstone Belt

Zimbabwe
Belingwe Greenstone Belt
Gweru-Shurugwi Greenstone Belt
Harare greenstone belt
Bindura-Shamva greenstone belt
Wedza Greenstone belt
Bulawayo-Bubi Greenstone belt
Makaha Greenstone Belt
Beatrice Greenstone Belt 
Dindi Greenstone Belt 
Mt Darwin Greenstone Belt

Eurasia

Russia
Kostomuksha greenstone belt

Finland
Central Lapland Greenstone Belt (Lapland)
Tipasjärvi-Kuhmo-Suomussalmi greenstone belt

Norway
Mauken greenstone belt

Oceania
Harris greenstone belt (Australia)
Jack Hills greenstone belt (Australia)
Norseman-Wiluna greenstone belt (Australia)
Saddleback greenstone belt (Australia)
Southern Cross greenstone belt (Australia)
Yandal greenstone belt (Australia)
Yalgoo-Singleton greenstone belt (Australia)

North America

Canada
Abitibi greenstone belt (Quebec/Ontario)
Bird River greenstone belt (Manitoba)
Ecstall Greenstone Belt (British Columbia)
Ennadai greenstone belt (Saskatchewan)
Flin Flon greenstone belt (Manitoba/Saskatchewan)
Hope Bay greenstone belt (Nunavut)
Hunt River greenstone belt (Newfoundland and Labrador)
Nuvvuagittuq Greenstone Belt (Quebec)
Red Lake greenstone belt (Ontario)
Rice Lake greenstone belt (Manitoba)
Swayze greenstone belt (Ontario)
Temagami Greenstone Belt (Ontario)
Yellowknife greenstone belt (Northwest Territories)

Greenland
Isua greenstone belt (Southwestern Greenland)

United States
Elmers Rock greenstone belt (Wyoming)
Franciscan Assemblage (California)
Rattlesnake Hills greenstone belt (Wyoming)
Seminoe Mountains greenstone belt (Wyoming)
South Pass greenstone belt (Wyoming)

South America

Brazil
Santa Rita greenstone belt

Venezuela, Guyana, Suriname, French Guiana, Brazil
Northern Guiana Shield greenstone belt

References

Greenstone belts